Major General Tin Sein (1926 – 15 August 2020) was a Burmese military official and major general in the Myanmar Army. He has served as Deputy Minister of Defence of Myanmar under of Ne Win's cabinet.

Tin Sein's son, Nay Soe Maung married to Kyi Kyi Shwe, the daughter of Than Shwe, Myanmar's dictator and formerly head of a military junta.

Tin Sein died on 15 August 2020.

References

1926 births
2020 deaths
Burmese military personnel
Government ministers of Myanmar